Christian Oliver B. Vazquez (born February 8, 1977) is a Filipino actor, model and a former housemate of ABS-CBN's Pinoy Big Brother: Pinoy Big Brother: Celebrity Edition. During his stint at Pinoy Big Brother, he was one of the comedian housemates. He graduated from high school at the University of St. La Salle-Integrated School Batch 1994 in Bacolod City.

An Ilonggo, Vazquez gained popularity for his PLDT and Trosyd Lotion commercial in which a father who lives in Iloilo forced his son who studies in Manila to take up medicine instead of fine arts. Against his father's will, he took up fine arts instead and finally his father accepted his son's decision. The line of the commercial which is mixed of Ilonggo and Tagalog "Kung saan ka masaya te suportahan ta ka" ("I will support you, wherever you are gonna be happy with") made him popular.

On March 4, 2006, Vazquez became the second housemate to be officially evicted from the Pinoy Big Brother house and the fourth housemate to leave the house. He received 13.5% of the people's vote, so far the lowest among that edition's evictees.

Personal life 
Vasquez has two children from a previous marriage and a daughter named Christienne Aubrielle.

Filmography

Television

Film

References

External links

1977 births
21st-century Filipino male actors
Living people
Filipino male film actors
Filipino male models
Filipino male television actors
Hiligaynon people
Male actors from Negros Occidental
People from Bacolod
Participants in Philippine reality television series
Pinoy Big Brother contestants
Star Magic
ABS-CBN personalities
GMA Network personalities
Visayan people